Vachellia nubica is a species of plant in the family Fabaceae.

Botanical description
It is a somewhat obconical shrub which grows up to about 5 metres high.  The branches often radiate from the base in all directions.  The branchlets tend to be straight and are grey-white, with grey-white spines with brown tips, 0.5 to 1.5 cm long. The pinnae are in 3 to 12 pairs, with leaflets in 5 to 15 pairs, about 0.3 cm long. The flowers are off-white in globose heads, and are very fragrant Pods are 5 to 10 cm long, 1.25 cm broad and pale yellow, pointed at both ends. The seeds are olive-green, with five to ten in a pod.   It has an offensive smell when bruised or cut.

Distribution
Vachellia nubica occurs mainly on alluvial silt soils.  It is found in north-east Africa from Egypt to Kenya, and also in Iraq and Iran.

Uses
It is an important browse shrub in the drier parts of Kenya.  The leaves and pods are high in calcium, and the leaves are a good source of phosphorus.

The bark extract is said to have medicinal value amongst the Borana of Ethiopia, where it is boiled amongst other things for colds.  Amongst the Samburu of Kenya is used for "women's stomach pain, hetpatitis, fever and gonorrhoea". the bark is peeled, soaked in water and drunk as tea.

References

nubica